Victory Sports Club is a Maldivian sports club based in Malé and founded 3 July 1971, that includes a football team amongst other sports. Victory is one of the most successful football clubs in Maldives, winning a record 21 National Championships. They have also won the Dhivehi League (founded in 2000) twice, and the national FA Cup four times.

Achievements

Domestic competitions
 Maldives National Championship: 
 

 Maldives FA Cup: 
 1993, 2000, 2009, 2010

 Dhivehi League: 2
 2001, 2007

 Male' League: 3
 2001, 2006

 Maldives Cup Winners' Cup: 3
 2001, 2002, 2006

 POMIS Cup: 1
 1999

Youth team
FAM Youth Championship: 1
 2012

Doubles, Trebles, Quadruple and Hat-trick
 Doubles
 National Championship and Cup Winners' Cup: 3 (2001, 2002, 2006)
 National Championship and Male' League: 3 (2001, 2003, 2006)
 National Championship and FA Cup: 2 (2000, 2009)
 Male' League and Cup Winners' Cup: 2 (2001, 2006)
 National Championship and Dhivehi League: 1 (2000)
 National Championship and Super Cup: 1 (2006)
 Dhivehi League and FA Cup: 1 (2000)
 Cup Winners' Cup and Super Cup: 1 (2006)
 Male' League and Super Cup: 1 (2006)
 Trebles
 National Championship, Dhivehi League and FA Cup: 1 (2000)
 National Championship, Male' League and Cup Winners' Cup: 1 (2001)
 Hat-trick
 National Championship: 2 times (1983, 1984, 1985) and (2000, 2001, 2002)

Performance in AFC competitions

 Asian Club Championship: 5 appearances
1987: Qualifying Stage
1988: Qualifying Stage
1990: Qualifying Stage
1994: Group Stage
1998: Second Round

 AFC Cup: 4 appearances
2007: Group Stage
2008: Group Stage
2010: Group Stage
2011: Group Stage
2012: Qualifying play-off

 AFC Cup Winners Cup: 1 appearance
2001–02: Second Round

References

 
Football clubs in the Maldives
Football clubs in Malé
Association football clubs established in 1971
1971 establishments in the Maldives
Dhivehi Premier League clubs